Martha S. Klima (born December 3, 1938) was first elected in 1982 to represent District 9, which covered a portion of Baltimore County, Maryland, USA.  She unsuccessfully ran for the State Senate in 2002.  She was defeated by Jim Brochin.

Background
Klima served in the Maryland House of Delegates for 20 years.  First elected in 1982 and sworn in in 1983, she served on many committees, including: the Constitutional and Administrative Law Committee from 1983 until 1986, the Appropriations Committee from 1987 until 2003, the oversight committee on personnel from 1993 until 2003, the Joint Budget and Audit Committee from 1991 until 1994, the Special Joint Committee on Pensions from 1993 until 2003 and the Special Joint Committee on Group Homes from 1995 until 1997.

She was the Deputy Minority Whip from 1995 until 2002. She was also a member of the Joint Committee on Administrative, Executive and Legislative Review from 1995 until 2003, the Joint Committee on Welfare Reform from 1996 until 2003 and the Spending Affordability Committee from 1998 until 2003. She was the Vice-President of the Women Legislators of Maryland in 1988. She is a member of the National Conference of State Legislators. Finally, she was the chair of the Telecommunications and Information Technology Task Force for the American Legislative Exchange Council (ALEC).

Education
Klima graduated with her associate degree from Villa Julie College in Stevenson, Maryland.

Career
Klima's primary job early in life was a homemaker. However, she was also involved in politics early in life.  She is a past secretary of the Central Maryland Health Systems Agency. She was elected as a delegate to the Republican Party National Convention in 1984, which nominated Ronald Reagan and George H. W. Bush.

Additionally, Klima was a member of the Baltimore County Chamber of Commerce, once serving as chair of the membership relations committee. She is a past member and governing trustee of the Council on Economic Education in Maryland. She was a board member for the Center for Prevention of Child Abuse of Maryland, and vice-chair of the Greater Baltimore Medical Center from 1986 until 1991.

Klima has won numerous awards and received recognition during her long career, including being appointed an honorary life member of the Maryland Congress of Parents and Teachers.  She was once received the Woman of the Year Award from the Towsontowne Business and Professional Women's Club in 1988. She was awarded Outstanding Legislative Member by ALEC in 1994. She also received the Legislative Award from the Baltimore County Commission on Disabilities in 1994. She also received the Public Service Award from the Baltimore Association for Retarded Citizens in 1994 and finally, the Legislator of the Year award from ALEC in 2001.

From 2003 through 2009, she served  on the Maryland Parole Commission.

Election results
2002 Race for Maryland State Senate – District 42
Voters to choose two:
{| class="wikitable"
!Name
!Votes
!Percent
!Outcome
|-
|Jim Brochin, Dem.
|22,709
|  51%
|   Won
|-
|Martha S. Klima, Rep.
|21,781
|  48.9%
|   Lost
|-
|Other Write-Ins
|45
|  0.1%
|   Lost
|}

1998 Race for Maryland House of Delegates – District 9A
Voters to choose two:
{| class="wikitable"
!Name
!Votes
!Percent
!Outcome
|-
|Martha S. Klima, Rep.
|19,190
|  40%
|   Won
|-
|A. Wade Kach, Rep.
|18,382
|  38%
|   Won
|-
|Stephen C. Kirsch, Dem.
|10,584
|  22%
|   Lost
|}

1994 Race for Maryland House of Delegates – District 9B
Voters to choose two:
{| class="wikitable"
!Name
!Votes
!Percent
!Outcome
|-
|Martha S. Klima, Rep.
|19,927
|  38%
|   Won
|-
|A. Wade Kach, Rep.
|18,734
|  36%
|   Won
|-
|Shelley Buckingham, Dem.
|7,829
|  15%
|   Lost
|-
|Raymond A. Huber, Dem.
|5,823
|  11%
|   Lost
|}

1990 Race for Maryland House of Delegates – District 9
Voters to choose three:
{| class="wikitable"
!Name
!Votes
!Percent
!Outcome
|-
|Martha S. Klima, Rep.
|15,461
|  19%
|   Won
|-
|Gerry L. Brewster, Dem.
|14,876
|  19%
|   Won
|-
|John J. Bishop, Rep.
|14,589
|  18%
|   Won
|-
|Michael Gisriel, Dem.
|14,428
|  18%
|   Lost
|-
|Charles Culbertson, Dem.
|10,522
|  13%
|   Lost
|-
|James Holechek, Rep.
|9,855
|  12%
|   Lost
|}

1986 Race for Maryland House of Delegates – District 9
Voters to choose three:
{| class="wikitable"
!Name
!Votes
!Percent
!Outcome
|-
|Martha S. Klima, Rep.
|16,082
|  19%
|   Won
|-
|Michael Gisriel, Dem.
|14,329
|  17%
|   Won
|-
|John J. Bishop, Rep.
|14,004
|  17%
|   Won
|-
|Patrick E. Carter, Rep.
|13,003
|  16%
|   Lost
|-
|Jack R. Sturgill Jr., Dem.
|12,819
|  16%
|   Lost
|-
|William R. Richardson Jr., Dem.
|12,291
|  15%
|   Lost
|}

References and notes

External links
 http://www.msa.md.gov/msa/mdmanual/06hse/former/html/msa12256.html

Republican Party members of the Maryland House of Delegates
1938 births
Living people
Stevenson University alumni
Politicians from Baltimore
Women state legislators in Maryland
20th-century American politicians
20th-century American women politicians
21st-century American politicians
21st-century American women politicians